Andrew Richard Rosindell MP (born 17 March 1966) is a British Conservative politician. He became the Member of Parliament (MP) for the Romford constituency in Greater London in 2001. 

He has been the international director of the European Foundation, chairman of the All Party Parliamentary Flags & Heraldry Committee and the UK's All-Party Parliamentary Group on the British Overseas Territories. Rosindell holds socially conservative and Eurosceptic political views.

Rosindell campaigned for Brexit and was one of the 28 original Conservative MPs who rebelled against Theresa May's Brexit withdrawal agreement in 2019.

Early life and career

Rosindell was born in Romford, Greater London, as the son of a school dinner lady. Rosindell attended Marshalls Park School. He joined the Conservative Party at the age of 14.

He was chairman of the Young Conservatives from 1993 to 1994, chairman of the International Young Democrat Union from 1998 to 2002, and from 1997 to 2001, he was director of the European Foundation think tank. Before becoming an MP, he was a local councillor in Romford on Havering Council, winning the Chase Cross and Havering-atte-Bower ward from the Liberal Democrats in 1990 with a 25% swing. In 1998, he held the council seat and took an 88% share of the vote. This was the highest share of the vote by a Conservative in the local election in Greater London.

Parliamentary career
After unsuccessful attempts to win seats in Glasgow Provan in 1992 and Thurrock in 1997, Rosindell was elected to the House of Commons in the 2001 general election in Romford, defeating the former teacher and Labour MP, Eileen Gordon. Rosindell won 18,931 votes (53% share) – a swing of 9.2% from Labour to Conservative. It was one of just nine seats the Conservatives managed to regain after the 1997 Labour landslide at the 2001 election. Former Conservative Prime Minister Margaret Thatcher visited the constituency during the campaign, in which Rosindell also canvassed with his Staffordshire Bull Terrier 'Spike', who wore a union flag waistcoat. This was a tactic Rosindell had employed in previous elections, such as his unsuccessful campaign in Glasgow Provan in 1992.

At the 2005 election, Rosindell increased his majority to 11,589, winning 21,560 votes on a 59.1% share. This was the second highest Conservative share of the vote anywhere in the UK.

Rosindell was appointed by Michael Howard to be vice-chairman for Campaigning of the Conservative Party in 2004, and in December 2005 he became an Opposition Whip. In July 2007, he was appointed as a Shadow Minister for Home Affairs, with particular responsibility for animal welfare.

At the beginning of the MPs' expenses scandal, The Daily Telegraph reported that Rosindell "claimed more than £125,000 in second home expenses for a flat in London, while designating his childhood home 17 miles away – where his mother lived – as his main address", and between "2006 and 2008 claimed the maximum £400 a month for food".

Post-2010 career
In 2010, the BBC reported that Rosindell had breached Parliamentary rules by accepting subsidised overseas trips to Gibraltar and subsequently raising multiple Gibraltar-related issues in Parliament without disclosing the trips in the Register of Members' Interests.

At the 2010 election, Rosindell increased his majority to 16,594, winning 26,031 votes on a reduced 56.0% share. In September of that year, Rosindell sponsored the first Erotica event to be held in the Houses of Parliament. Rosindell maintained that he was promoting the hosts, a Romford-based business, as was his duty as the constituency MP.

In June 2012, Rosindell was criticised for expressing "huge admiration" for former Chilean President Augusto Pinochet. The comments were condemned by Labour Leader Ed Miliband MP and neighbouring Labour MP Jon Cruddas, who stated in an interview with the Romford Recorder that "Augusto Pinochet assumed power in a coup d'état and overthrew a democratically elected government. According to various reports and investigations thousands of people were killed in this process, and tens of thousands were interned and tortured by his regime". Rosindell made the comments whilst defending a local colleague who had been criticised for apparently endorsing Pinochet, and stated that Pinochet had overthrown a "far worse" communist regime and that "we should be grateful" for the assistance Pinochet's Chile provided to the British forces retaking the Falkland Islands.

In February 2015, Rosindell cast doubt on the ability of Rachel Reeves (then Shadow Secretary of State for Work and Pensions) to handle that ministerial responsibility in a putative post-election Labour cabinet, as she would be taking maternity leave soon after the election and would then have a young child to care for following her return to the post in September. He was criticised for the remarks by Labour MPs, whilst Conservative leader and Prime Minister David Cameron described his comments as "outrageous".

At the 2015 election Rosindell was re-elected with 25,067 votes, on a 51% share, and also gained re-election to the Foreign Affairs Select Committee. Since the start of 2016, Rosindell has also been a member of the Advisory Board of the UK-based 'Polar Regions' think-tank Polar Research and Policy Initiative. At the 2017 election Rosindell was re-elected with 29,671 votes, on a 59.4% share. In 2017, Rosindell co-sponsored a Bill with Lord Empey to use Libyan funds frozen under Chapter 7 of the UN Charter, to compensate victims of IRA terrorism supported by the Gaddafi regime.

On 4 July 2018, Rosindell announced his bid to become the Conservative candidate for Mayor of London. He failed to make the final shortlist.

In January 2019, The Times discovered that Rosindell's Facebook account was a member of a group supporting far-right activist Tommy Robinson. The group was specifically concerned with supporting Robinson after he was jailed for contempt of court. Rosindell said that he had been added to the group without his knowledge; however, according to The Times it would be necessary for a Facebook user to confirm acceptance before being added to a group.

On 21 October 2020 Rosindell was removed as trade envoy to Tanzania, a position to which he had been appointed to by Theresa May in 2018, because of his highly critical views against Boris Johnson's three-tier lockdown plan to tackle the second wave of the coronavirus pandemic in the UK.

In July 2021 while appearing on BBC's Politics Live, Rosindell defended the ending of the Universal Credit uplift saying: "I think there are people that quite like getting the extra £20 but maybe they don't need it." 

In November 2021, during an interview on BBC's Newsnight, Rosindell said he was cautious about the idea of MPs being banned from having second jobs. He said MPs are "human beings who have families and responsibilities" but the first duty of MPs "must be to Parliament, to our constituency and to the work we do for our country."

Political views 

Rosindell's political views are socially conservative and Thatcherite: he is a Eurosceptic, who supports the re-introduction of the death penalty and the detention of asylum seekers. A 2002 BBC profile called him "a right-wing populist". He is also a member of right-wing groups The Freedom Association and a supporter of the Blue Collar Conservatives. He was a member of the Monday Club, a Conservative-aligned organisation on the right of the party, until he was compelled to resign in 2001 by the party's then-leader Iain Duncan Smith.

Following an interim report on the connections between colonialism and properties now in the care of the National Trust, including links with historic slavery, Rosindell was among the signatories of a letter to The Telegraph in November 2020 from the "Common Sense Group" of Conservative Parliamentarians. The letter accused the National Trust of being "coloured by cultural Marxist dogma, colloquially known as the 'woke agenda'".

LGBT rights
Rosindell has consistently voted against bills furthering LGBT rights, including equalising the age of consent, civil partnerships and scrapping the Section 28 act, which banned teachers from "promoting homosexuality" or "teaching ... the acceptability of homosexuality as a pretended family relationship", he said, "I do not believe that politicians should interfere with and attempt to redefine ancient customs, traditions and ceremonies, most of which are based on religious foundations and have been in existence through the ages." He opposed the legalisation of same-sex marriage, saying: "Where would it end? You could finish up at a stage where the monarchy in this country is in a same-sex marriage and that would have constitutional implications".

Euroscepticism and border control 

In 2012, he unsuccessfully attempted to introduce the United Kingdom Borders Bill in 2012, a private member's bill aiming to create a dedicated entry queue for citizens of countries where the British Queen is head of state, as well as introducing pictures of the Queen and more royal symbols at UK borders. He reiterated calls for preferential treatment of "Her Majesty's subjects" visiting Britain in 2015, whilst also calling for the immigration system to favour Commonwealth citizens, as opposed to those from the EU. This measure was then adopted by Chancellor Philip Hammond in his October 2018 budget.

Rosindell has spoken in favour of a federal UK and in 2014 proposed a bill calling for a separate English Parliament, whilst declaring himself opposed to the idea of imposing English votes for English laws restrictions on the Westminster Parliament.

In September 2015, Rosindell presented a Ten Minute Rule Bill to Parliament entitled the United Kingdom Borders (Control and Sovereignty) Bill. In his speech presenting the Bill, he argued that Britain must take back control of its borders from the European Union, asserting that "A nation that does not retain sovereignty over its national borders will ultimately be powerless to determine its own destiny". The speech also advocated a policy of controlled immigration, arguing that public services were unable to keep up with the number of people entering the country every year.

In an early day motion of 3 November 2016, as a celebration of the Brexit vote and Britain withdrawing from the European Union, Rosindell argued for a return to the broadcasting of "God Save the Queen" at the end of BBC One transmissions each day. The practice was dropped in 1997 (ostensibly due to BBC One adopting 24-hour broadcasting by simulcasting BBC News 24 overnight, rendering closedown obsolete). That evening, BBC Two's Newsnight programme ended its nightly broadcast with host Kirsty Wark saying that they were "incredibly happy to oblige" Rosindell's request, before ending with a clip of the Sex Pistols performing the punk song of the same name (an anti-monarchist song), much to Rosindell's discontent.

In 2017, Rosindell said: "The humiliation of having a pink European Union passport will now soon be over and the United Kingdom nationals can once again feel pride and self-confidence in their own nationality when travelling, just as the Swiss and Americans can do. National identity matters and there is no better way of demonstrating this today than by bringing back this much-loved national symbol when travelling overseas."

Foreign affairs 

In July 2010, Rosindell was appointed by the Chairman of the Conservative Party, Sayeeda Warsi, onto the board of the Westminster Foundation for Democracy. Since 2015, Rosindell has served on the Foreign Affairs Select Committee.

Rosindell proposed in 2012 that Crown Dependencies and British Overseas Territories should be represented in the UK parliament, like dependencies of Australia, Denmark, France and the Netherlands have been.

During the police action surrounding the 2017 Catalan independence referendum, Rosindell spoke out in his capacity as the vice-chairman of the APPG on Catalonia to say the UK should have sent a 'much stronger' message about condemning the Spanish government's reaction, saying the violence 'brought shame on Spain and shame on the European Union.'

Animal welfare 

In 2012, Rosindell became chairman of the All-Party Parliamentary Zoos and Aquariums Group.

Rosindell joined Philip Davies and Christopher Chope in repeatedly blocking a backbench bill banning the use of wild animals in circuses from progressing through Parliament, finally blocking it by lodging an objection in March 2015. Rosindell had earlier argued the circus is a "Great British institution…[that] deserves to be defended against the propaganda and exaggerations". The bill had the support of the Coalition government, the Labour opposition and public opinion.

Flags and heraldry 

Rosindell is well known for his interest in flags, being described by The Times in 2011 as a "flag fanatic". He is a member of the Flag Institute, an educational organisation that offers advice and guidance about flags and their usage.

On 5 February 2008, Rosindell became founding chairman of the All Party Parliamentary Flag Group (APPFG), and proposed a Union Flag Bill under the Ten Minute Rule. The APPFG changed its name to the Flags & Heraldry Committee in April 2010.

In April 2021 Rosindell joined other Conservative Party members in calling for the Union Flag to be flown outside UK schools.

References

External links
Andrew Rosindell official site

1966 births
British activists
British monarchists
Conservative Party (UK) MPs for English constituencies
Councillors in the London Borough of Havering
Living people
People from Romford
UK MPs 2001–2005
UK MPs 2005–2010
UK MPs 2010–2015
UK MPs 2015–2017
UK MPs 2017–2019
UK MPs 2019–present
International Young Democrat Union chairs
People educated at Marshalls Park School
Members of the Freedom Association
British Eurosceptics